Hawaiia minuscula, common name the minute gem or minute gem snail, is a species of very small air-breathing land snail, a terrestrial pulmonate gastropod mollusk or micromollusk in the family Pristilomatidae.

Distribution 
The indigenous distribution of this snail species is: North America.
Utah (Hawaiia minuscula minuscula and Hawaiia minuscula neomexicana)

The non-indigenous distribution includes:
 Australia
 Czech Republic as a "hothouse alien"
 Great Britain as a "hothouse alien"

References

Pristilomatidae
Gastropods described in 1840
Gastropods of Lord Howe Island